Eric Neisse (born 27 November 1964 in Sorengo, Switzerland) is a retired male race walker from France. He competed at the 1988 Summer Olympics.

Achievements

References

sports-reference

1964 births
Living people
French male racewalkers
Olympic athletes of France
Athletes (track and field) at the 1988 Summer Olympics
People from Sorengo